Leptobrachium ngoclinhense is a species of frog in the family Megophryidae from Vietnam.

Range
It is known from two localities in southern Vietnam:
Ngoc Linh Mountain, Dak Glei District, Kon Tum Province
Chu Yang Sin Nature Reserve, Dak Lak Province

References

ngoclinhense
Amphibians described in 2005